South Korea's women's national sevens rugby union team represents South Korea in Rugby sevens at international level.

Tournament history

Summer Olympics

Rugby World Cup Sevens

Asian Games

Current squad
Squad at 2010 Asian Games:

Team Management
Manager: Dong Ho Kang
Physiotherapist: Heyok Jun Lee

2010 Asian Games

Pool A

China 51 – 0 South Korea
Thailand 48 – 0 South Korea
Hong Kong 36 – 0 South Korea

Quarterfinals
Kazakhstan 52 – 0 South Korea

5th - 8th Place Play-off

References

Asian national women's rugby union teams
Rugby union in South Korea
South Korea national rugby union team
Women's national rugby sevens teams